Eumathes cuprascens is a species of beetle in the family Cerambycidae. It was described by Bates in 1874. It is known from Nicaragua and Panama.

References

Calliini
Beetles described in 1874